Urayasu Station (浦安駅) is the name of two train stations in Japan:

 Urayasu Station (Chiba)
 Urayasu Station (Tottori)